Marion, That's Not Nice is a 1933 German comedy film directed by E. W. Emo and starring Magda Schneider, Hermann Thimig, and Otto Wallburg. It was shot at the Johannisthal Studios in Berlin. A separate Italian-language version Model Wanted was made at the same time. The following year the film was remade in Britain as There Goes Susie.

Synopsis
A soap tycoon is shocked to discover that the girl chosen as the model for his new advertising campaign is his own daughter.

Cast

References

Bibliography 
 Klaus, Ulrich J. Deutsche Tonfilme: Jahrgang 1933. Klaus-Archiv, 1988.

External links 
 

1933 films
1933 drama films
German drama films
Films of the Weimar Republic
1930s German-language films
Films directed by E. W. Emo
German multilingual films
German black-and-white films
Films about fictional painters
Films about advertising
1933 multilingual films
1930s German films
Films shot at Johannisthal Studios